Comic and manga adaptations of The Legend of Zelda series of video games, especially in Japan, have been published under license from Nintendo.

Valiant Comics series
Valiant Comics published a comic series simply titled The Legend of Zelda in 1990, which lasted only five issues dated from February to June, as part of their Nintendo Comics System imprint. The series was more closely patterned after The Legend of Zelda TV series airing at the time, which in turn was loosely based on the first two NES games.

Characters
 Link, adventurer and hero of Hyrule
 Catherine, Link's horse
 Princess Zelda of Hyrule
 King Harkinian, father of Zelda, and ruler of Hyrule
 Impa, Zelda's nursemaid
 Ganon, an evil wizard and King of Darkness
 Captain Krin, Captain of the Guard of North Castle. A new character created for the comics

Titles by Akira Himekawa
The manga team of Akira Himekawa has been producing manga adaptations of The Legend of Zelda video games in Japan beginning with their manga adaptation of The Legend of Zelda: Ocarina of Time, which was first published in 1999 by Shogakukan.

Currently, Himekawa has produced manga adaptations of more than eight Zelda games (including both Oracle games), with the latest being The Legend of Zelda: Twilight Princess manga. Viz Media is currently publishing English translations of Himekawa's Zelda manga in North America, beginning with their adaptation of Ocarina of Time, which was published in October 2008.

, a French translation is being published by Soleil Manga. The first manga available was A Link to the Past followed by Ocarina of Time 1 & 2. Himekawa's other Zelda manga was later translated into French in 2010.

Himekawa's manga, which was released in Japan in and between 1998 and 2009, was also localised in the Federal Republic of Germany by Tokyopop in and between 2009 and 2011. The first ten tankōbon volumes sold more than 3million copies worldwide.

After a seven-year hiatus, Akira Himekawa began the work on a new Zelda manga. Later revealed to be an adaptation of The Legend of Zelda: Twilight Princess, the manga series ran from February 2016 to January 2022.

Ocarina of Time
  (Volume 1)
  (Volume 2)
  (Volume 1, English Edition)
  (Volume 2, English Edition)
Released in 1998, and the English version in 2008, it is an adaptation of The Legend of Zelda: Ocarina of Time. There are two story arcs in this manga: Child arc (こども編 Kodomo-hen) and Adult arc (おとな編 Otona-hen). The protagonist is Link (リンク Rinku/Link) and during the course of the book he is on a quest to stop Ganondorf (ガノンドロフ Ganondorofu) from taking over Hyrule (ハイラル Hairaru). Princess Zelda (ゼルダ姫 Zeruda/Zelda-hime) helps him in his quest. The book more-or-less follows the same plot as the game; however there are a few differences in plot from the game. There are six chapters in the first book, and nine in the second. Some of the added information in the manga is added to explain certain points; for example, in the manga pierced ears is a traditional rite of Sheikah passage, although this is not included in the game. 
The series was published in English by Viz Media in North America as Volumes 1 and 2, respectively.

Ocarina of Time
SEASON 1 [2012]
 The Great Deku Tree Incident 2-28-2012
 In Kokiri Forest, the only Kokiri without a fairy, Link, is outcast by their supposed leader, Mido, but also befriended by another, Saria. He dreams of one day leaving the forest. One night, a creature named Queen Gohma is unleashed inside the Kokiri's guardian, The Great Deku Tree...
 Link's Journey Begins 3-31-2012
 Link and Mido venture into the Great Deku Tree to fight Queen Gohma. They manage to defeat her, forcing her to regress to her original beetle-state. But despite it, the Great Deku Tree still dies, though he reveals to Link that he must stop the evil man responsible for this act from obtaining the Triforce...
 The Mystery of the Triforce 4-7-2012 
 On the Great Deku Tree's instructions, Link journeys to Hyrule in search of Princess Zelda. However, he gets in trouble over the matter of taking food without paying. A mysterious girl saves Link and offers to help him find Zelda if he spends a day playing with her, but the two part when a group of Gerudo mercenaries show up after the girl. Losing her in the chaos, Link eventually travels to Hyrule Castle on his own only to find out the girl he met was Zelda herself and the identity of the evil man who sent Gohma, Ganondorf...
 The Search for the Spiritual Stone of Fire! 4-14-2012
 Learning the location of the Goron's Ruby, Link sets off for Death Mountain. On the way, Link attracts a filly with his Ocarina which allows him to reach Death Mountain much faster. Once there however, the keeper of the ruby, Goron chief Darunia, refuses to part with the gem. That is unless Link defeats the Dodongo King that is preventing the Gorons from getting their food supply...
 Inside Jabu-Jabu's Belly 4-21-2012
 Obtaining the Goron's Ruby, Link ends up at Lon Lon Ranch where the filly Epona lives. There he meets Malon and the giant owl Kaepora Gaebora, an old friend of the Great Deku Tree. The owl carries Link to Zora's Domain where the final gem, the Zora's Sapphire, is; however, the holder of it, Princess Ruto, was swallowed by Lord Jabu-Jabu, the Zora's guardian deity whom she is in charge of caring for. Link gets swallowed as well and faces Barinade. After defeating the monster, it turns out Ruto was hiding because she had no interest in the arranged marriage her father set up...
 The Hero of Time Is Born 5-2-2012
 With the three jewels, Link returns to Hyrule, which is now under attack by Ganondorf and his monsters. In the midst of the chaos, Zelda and Impa escape, but not before the princess throws the Ocarina of Time to Link. Ganondorf tries to take it from Link after easily defeating him, but he takes the ocarina Saria gave to Link by mistake. With the Ocarina, Link decides to get the Triforce himself before Ganondorf does. He finds the Master Sword and takes it out, only to be placed in suspended animation for seven years. As revealed to him by the Sage Rauru, while Link was suspended Ganondorf took the Triforce and plunged Hyrule into darkness. Link also learns of his true heritage as a Hylian. Now Link must wake the other five Sages to stop Ganondorf...

Hero of Time
SEASON 2 [2012-2013]
 Sword of Legend: The Master Sword 11-8-2012
 Emerging from the temple, Link saves a Hylian knight from a Stalfos, the same Stalfos who he tried to fight as a kid. He soon learns that Zelda has not been seen since the day Hyrule was attacked and that in Hyrule Castle's place is Ganon's Tower. Coping with the changes, Link begins his journey by heading towards the Forest temple. In Ganon's Tower, the remains of Stalfos reveal to Ganondorf that the Hero of Time has come. As a result, Ganondorf summons his shadow to kill Link...
 The Sage of the Forest: Saria 11-15-2012
 On his way to the Forest Temple, Link arrives at Kokiri Forest, only to find that his childhood home is now in ruins. In the midst of it was Mido, who is doing his best to protect the forest. Though he is unaware that the one who saved him was Link, he blamed the hero for causing the attack on the Kokiri people and for Saria entering the Forest Temple. The two enter the Forest Temple, only to encounter Phantom Ganon, who has Saria trapped in a painting...
 An Old and Beloved Friend 11-22-2012
 At Death Mountain, Link tries to reason with the dragon that terrorizes the Goron, Volvagia. As it turns out, prior to Link looking for the Spiritual Stones, Link freed Volvagia while it was a hatchling and befriended him. But Ganondorf used his power to turn Volvagia into a blood-thirsty monster, which Link forced to kill his old friend...
 Link Vs. Link 12-6-2012
 Arriving at Kakariko Village, Link is reunited with Epona. He also encounters Impa, who now protects the village. Under her guidance, Link tries to hone his swordsmanship. But things get worse when a new monster emerges, resembling Link...
 Shadow Guide: Sheik 1-21-2013
 As punishment for being denied Epona as his horse, Ganondorf gives Mr. Ingo the death penalty. However, the Twinrova Sisters decide to use him to lure Link out to the open. When Link learns from Mr. Talon that Malon is being held hostage, he goes to Lon Lon Ranch to save her. But Ingo and a platoon of Gerudo are waiting for him in the midst of the fight. Sheik reveals that Zelda is somewhere in the Haunted Wasteland...
 The Haunted Wasteland 4-21-2013
 After helping Ruto in the Water Temple, Link heads off to the Haunted Wasteland. He is saved by Sheik during a desert storm, but when the Gerudo came for them Sheik knocks Link out. When Link comes to, he takes down the commanding Gerudo, Nabooru, and tries to escape the Gerudo Fortress. Sheik arrives and appears to want to fight Link. But it turns out he is here to help him. Furious at this betrayal, Koume and Kotake attack Sheik. When Link checks to see if Sheik is all right, he notices the Triforce crest on his hand...
 A Fated Reunion 4-5-2013 
 With Nabooru's help, Link gets Sheik out of the Gerudo Fortress. Hiding out in the Spirit Temple, Link learns that Sheik is in fact Zelda in disguise. After Ganondorf took over, Zelda had Impa make her into a Sheikah, posing as a descendant of the exiled Sheikah to win Ganondorf's trust, even if it meant deceiving Link as well. It is also revealed that Ganondorf only obtained a third of the Triforce's power. The Twinrova sisters soon arrive to kill Link and take Zelda, but Nabooru gives Link the Mirror Shield she recently stole from the temple to kill the witches with their own magic. However, the victory is short as Ganondorf takes Zelda, the holder of the Triforce of Wisdom...
 Ganondorf Defeated! 4-28-2013
 After learning more about Ganondorf from Nabooru, Link takes her with him to save Zelda. But Ganon's Tower is unreachable until Nabooru 'awakens' as the 6th sage, combining her powers with the others to create a bridge to get Link into the castle. In there, Link learns that he possesses the Triforce of Courage as he fights and defeats Ganondorf.
 A New Journey Begins 5-5-2013
 Link and Zelda escape the collapsing Ganon's Tower. While it seems to be the end, Ganondorf emerges. The raw hatred he has for Link causes the Triforce of Power to change him into a monster. It is a long and difficult battle, but Link defeats Ganon before the Sages use their powers to banish the monster into the Dark World. Zelda reveals that she is responsible for Ganondorf being able to take over, but as the final sage, Zelda has the power to send Link back to his own time to start things anew. Link reveals his love for Zelda, but Zelda tells him that he must go back, so Link gave her the Ocarina of Time.  Link returns to his own time, which is now devoid of Ganondorf's evil, as a child.  There, the new Deku tree sprouts, and Mido waits for his friend to come back. Like the game, Zelda turns around at her garden window to see Link walking forward, and the story ends with the two looking at each other in the same pose as in the game's end screen.

Side stories
 The Skull Kid and the Mask (2-parter): Taking place before Ocarina of Time, Link is making a mask for a Kokiri festival where he plays a prince. However, this mask is stolen, and Link goes to find out who is responsible. He and Saria end up in the Lost Woods, where they find the one who stole the mask, a Skull Kid that serves under the evil Baga Tree who wishes to take the forest for himself.
 Rouru of the Watarara: Taking place after the Water Temple, Link is fishing at Lake Hylia when he fishes up a strange creature. The child is of the bird-like Watarara who come to Hyrule once a year. Link tries to help the Watarara child, Rouro, learn how to fly. The problem is that Rouro is stubborn and picks on Navi. When Ganondorf's monsters attack, Link does not have Navi to help him out...

Majora's Mask
 
  (English Edition)
Released in 2000, and the English version in 2009, it is an adaptation of The Legend of Zelda: Majora's Mask, continuing from where the previous adaptation ended. It is one volume, and the last chapter includes the artist's speculation of where Majora's mask originated. The volume was published in English by Viz Media in North America as Volume 3.

According to the manga, which is a different story than that of the game itself, the mask itself was an ancient and dangerous artifact made from the armor of a legendary and evil beast named Majora that was danced to dying exhaustion by a being disguised as a human traveler. According to a legend devised "by the humans themselves", any who obtain the beast's armour gains hold of a great and terrible power. All who approached it, warriors, men and women alike, even with good intentions, were devoured without remorse. The early Terminian tribes used the mask in their cursed hexing rituals, but when the evils caused by the mask became too much to bear, they sealed it away in darkness forever... so they hoped.

As the mask of the devil, Majora's Mask gained its power from the evil desires that people had in their minds as they were devoured by the beast, or when they cast the hexes when the armor was made into the mask. As it passed from member to member in the tribe it accumulated its power until it was too much to control. The tribe died out, but the mask still rested in darkness. The Happy Mask Salesman went to great lengths to get it, but while travelling in the Lost Woods it was stolen by Skull Kid and his fairies, Tatl and Tael (a reference to the phrase, tattle tail). When the Skull Kid wore it the evil essence trapped within possessed him, beckoning him to Termina, and making him cause harm amongst the townspeople, most notably interfering with the engagement of Anju to Kafei. The most serious problem caused by the mask was that the moon was torn out of its orbit, and was on a collision course with Termina's capital city. The moon would have exterminated all life in a cataclysm of fire had it not been for Link's intervention. With the power of the Fierce Deity's Mask, he defeated Majora's Mask and saved Termina. The moon was sent back into orbit after these events.

As stated above, while Skull Kid was possessed, he wronged many of the people in Termina. In addition, he sealed his former friends, the Four Guardians in the masks of evil deities and sealed them in the temples located in the four compass directions. Link had to free all of them in order to save Termina.

Chapters
 Skull Kid and the Evil Mask
 After defeating Ganondorf, Link soon went on a journey to find Navi. While taking a break, both the Ocarina of Time Zelda entrusted to him and Epona were abducted by a Skull Kid and his two fairies. Link pursued them down a hole, only to discover that Skull Kid has a nasty surprise for him...
 Deku Scrub Link
 Turned into a Deku Scrub by Skull Kid, Link and the left-behind Tatl went to Clock Town. There Link saw familiar faces and ran into trouble, being a Deku Scrub. He was saved by Anju who revealed he was in Termina and that a rumor had spread that in three days, the moon would crash into Clock Town because of an evil Imp. Realizing the imp is Skull Kid, Link and Tatl confront him on top of the clock tower...
 The Happy Mask Salesman
 After retrieving the Ocarina of Time from Skull Kid, Link managed to reverse time. He ended up in the clock tower, three days prior, and restored to his human-self with a Deku Scrub mask. The Happy Mask Salesman arrived, asking Link to help him get Majora's mask back from Skull Kid. Link accepts and heads out into Termina for another adventure...
 Odolwa, the Marsh god
 Arriving at the Marshland, Link fell victim to the poison that polluted the waters. He is saved by monkeys; they then pleaded with him to save the Deku Scrub Princess, who was abducted by the monster responsible for the poison. Arriving at the Deku Scrub palace as a Deku Scrub, he tries to reason with the king who was wrongfully accusing others. Things got worse when the monster responsible for taking the Princess, Odolwa, appears. Link saved the princess and defeated Odolwa, whose mask shattered into a giant...
 The Monster at Snowhead
 Link heads toward the Snowhead Mountains, where he encountered the frozen remains of a Goron named Darmani, who fell in battle against the Masked Machine Goht. After Link plays the song of healing for his spirit, Darmani gives Link his spirit in the form of the Goron Mask. His final words were for Link to carry out his final mission to destroy Goht and teach a Goron child the fighting move he promised...
 Great Bay
 Arriving at the Great Bay, Link encountered Mikau of the IndiGo-Gos who were attacked by Gerudo pirates who stole the Zora Egg. Near death, Mikau's spirit was sealed inside of the Zora Mask so Link could use it to retrieve the egg. But the fight caused the gem to react and summon the Giant Turtle from its slumber. He guided Link and Lulu to where the Masked Fish Gyorg dwelled. Defeating Gyorg, Link then fulfilled Mikau's final wish...
 Anju & Kafei
 After defeating Twinmold, Link learns that the four giants are the protectors of Termina who will offer their services to him when the time is right. Returning to Clock Town, he encounters a strange boy wearing a Keaton Mask with a letter for Anju from Kafei. After learning of a relation between the giants and Skull Kid, Link and Tatl tracked down the masked boy, who was Kafei himself. He bumped into Skull Kid and was turned into a child for unintentionally insulting him. Kafei joins Link in tracking down Skull Kid...
 Stop the Moon!!
 Link and Kafei head toward the clock tower as the carnival is about to begin. The moon descends minute by minute as Skull Kid enjoys the anguish of Kafei of being a child and unable to show his face to Anju. But Anju arrived and was informed of Kafei's situation (thanks to Tatl), willing to accept Kafei no matter what form he's in. This annoyed Skull Kid just as the Four Giants arrive to stop the moon. But Skull Kid is suddenly in pain...
 Fierce Deity Link
 It soon was revealed that Skull Kid was friends with the four giants. But when they went their separate ways, Skull Kid was devastated. His sadness was exploited by Majora's Mask, who no longer needed Skull Kid. It removed itself from him and tried to kill its ex-host, but Link stopped it. Majora's Mask offered a new game, giving Link the Fierce Deity's Mask. Despite everyone's warnings, Link put the mask on and became a frightening warrior. Once on the moon, he defeated Majora's Mask in its many forms. The Happy Mask Salesman pops up to take back the seemingly powerless mask. After the wedding, Skull Kid learned the giants still considered him their friend. Link was reunited with Epona as they return to Hyrule to resume their search for Navi...
 Original Side Story: Reveals the origin of Majora's Mask.

Oracle of Seasons and Oracle of Ages
Based on Oracle of Seasons and Oracle of Ages, it spans 2 volumes. Oracle of Seasons and Oracle of Ages were published by Viz Media in English in North America as Volumes 4 and 5, respectively.

  (Oracle of Seasons)
  (Oracle of Ages)
  (Oracle of Seasons, English Edition)
  (Oracle of Ages, English Edition)

Oracle of Seasons
 Oracle of Seasons: Din the Dancer
 The Mysterious Land: Holodrum
 To the Temple of Seasons
 General of Darkness: Onox
 Sacred Pyramid: The Triforce
 A New Friend: Ricky
 The Great Witch: Maple
 The Castle in Darkness
 The Rod of Seasons
 Then into the Legend

Oracle of Ages
 Oracle of Ages: Nayru
 Sorceress of Shadows: Veran
 An Old Friend: Ralph
 Queen Ambi of Labrynna
 Sir Raven
 Overthrowing Veran
 The Pirate Captain
 Ramrock
 Mystery Seeds
 Veran's True Form
 The Return of the King of Evil

Four Swords
  (Volume 1)
  (Volume 2)
  (Volume 1, English Edition)
  (Volume 2, English Edition)
Based on The Legend of Zelda: Four Swords Adventures, it spans 2 volumes and 12 chapters. Included in volume two is an omake. The series is published in English by Viz Media in North America as Volumes 6 and 7, respectively.

Chapters
 Four Links
 The Fall of Hyrule Castle
 Erune and Rosie
 Links Torn Apart
 Deadly Battle at the Pyramid
 Temple of Darkness
 Climb Death Mountain
 Sad Shadow Link
 On to the Tower of Winds
 A Fight Against Father
 The Immortal Demon Vaati
 The Four Sword Forever!

The Minish Cap
 
  (English Edition)
Written by Akira Himekawa and published in early 2006 in Japan, this manga chronicles the adventures of Link in the game of the same name, including a short omake featuring Ezlo and Vaati.
Viz released an English adaptation of this manga as Volume 8 of their Zelda series on December 1, 2009.

Chapters
 Link and Vaati
 Shrunken Link
 Link and the Mountain Minish
 Ezlo and Vaati
 The King and the Wind Tribe
 True Strength

A Link to the Past
 
  (English Edition)
A manga adaptation of The Legend of Zelda: A Link to the Past (named Triforce of the Gods in Japan) following the release of the Game Boy Advance port. In its telling, Agahnim is revealed as a friend of Link's father. Agahnim took to magic and learned how to break the Seal of the Sages, being recruited to Ganon's services. When confronted by his friend, Agahnim sent him and his wife into the Dark World.

 Original characters
 Ghanti: A thief whose troupe was killed by Agahnim's soldiers. She befriended Link until she learned he was a descendant of the Knights of Hyrule, as she believed that the Knights had killed her parents. But in time Ghanti learned that the bandit who raised her had in fact lied to her, as she originated from Hyrule as a descendant of the Hylian Knights herself, carrying an arrowhead, part of the Silver Arrow. She took on the form of a fox in the Dark World. Ghanti is in love with Link and is at first jealous of Zelda for being close to him. She was eventually turned into Trinexx by Agahnim to fight Link, but in the end she becomes Link's stout ally and helps him defeat Ganon in the final battle.

Viz released an English adaptation of this manga (renamed A Link to the Past to fit the game's North American counterpart) as Volume 9 of their Zelda series on February 2, 2010.

Chapters
 Voice
 Legend
 A Sacrifice
 A Link to the Past

Phantom Hourglass
  (English Edition)
Originally released in Japan in early 2009, it is based on the DS adventure, The Legend of Zelda: Phantom Hourglass, the sequel to Wind Waker. Strangely, though the manga retains the game's characters and overall plot, many of the character's personalities and some events in the game were changed, sparking negative reactions from several fans of the original game. Despite this, however, it continues to receive positive reviews. Viz released an English adaptation of this manga as Volume 10 of their Zelda series on September 7, 2010.

Chapters
 Link and Tetra
 The Ghost Ship
 Linebeck the Sailor
 Isle of Ember
 Cannon Island
 Isle of Gust
 Molida Island
 Linebeck's Past and the Ghost Ship
 Tetra's True Identity
 Jolene the Pirate Girl
 A Confrontation with Bellum
 The Final Battle

Skyward Sword
The Legend of Zelda: Skyward Sword is a manga loosely based on the game of the same name drawn by Akira Himekawa. The 32 pages of the manga were included in the artbook Hyrule Historia. The manga serves as a prequel to the story of Skyward Sword.

Twilight Princess

A manga series based on The Legend of Zelda: Twilight Princess, penned and illustrated by Akira Himekawa, was first released on February 8, 2016. The adaptation began almost ten years after the release of the game on which it is based, but only a month before the release of the high-definition remake for the Wii U, Twilight Princess HD. The series concluded in January 2022 with 70 chapters spread across 11 volumes, nine of which have been translated into English to date.

Titles by Ataru Cagiva

Dreaming Island
 Volume 1
 
 Release date: May 1994
 Volume 2
 
 Release date: September 1994

Triforce of the Gods
 Original characters
 Raska: Link's childhood friend, a martial arts enthusiast.
 Tou: Raska's father. Shares the same enthusiasm for martial arts as Raska.
 Volume 1
 
 Release date: May 1995
 Volume 2
 
 Release date: November 1995
 Volume 3
 
 Release date: April 1996

Titles by Yuu Mishouzaki
 Legend of Zelda
 
 Release date: September 1989
 Adventure of Link
 
 Release date: August 1991

Other works

A Link to the Past by Shotaro Ishinomori
  (Japanese edition)
 ASIN B0006QBMJ6 (English edition)
It was created as a serial comic for Nintendo Power magazine by the acclaimed manga author Shotaro Ishinomori, and later collected in graphic novel form, this told an alternate version of the events from A Link to the Past. Though Link starts out a hapless, bumbling kid, caught up in something bigger than he ever imagined, he displays great courage and ultimately proves himself a determined and competent adventurer. This telling portrays Link's parents as Knights of Hyrule, lost to the Dark World.

Original characters
 Epheremelda: Link's fairy guide and companion who has a crush on Link, foreshadowing Navi from Ocarina of Time.
 Roam: A descendant of the Knights of Hyrule who fought in the imprisoning war. A master of archery, he is intent on killing Ganon by finding the Silver Arrows. Roam can turn himself into a Dreadhawk (his basic design was modeled after Jet Link/002 from Ishinomori's first successful creation, Cyborg 009).

Chapters
 Hero's Awakening
 Wise Man's Warning
 The Book of Mudora
 The Master Sword
 An Old Enemy
 A Fool in the Shape of a Tree
 Zora's Mask
 Roam, The Mystery Knight
 Wizzrobe's Trap
 To Turtle Rock..And Zelda!
 Ganon's Tower
 The Final Battle

Novels and Yonkoma manga
Five novels (published by Futabasha) and several Yonkoma manga (published by Shiseisha) based on aspects of The Legend of Zelda series have also been published.

The Legend of Zelda: The Wind Waker – Link's Logbook
This manga is an adaptation of The Wind Waker, but parodies scenarios in the game. Although it adapts most of The Wind Waker, it skips most dungeons and scenes to the very peak of the stories. It was released almost directly after The Wind Waker was released.

Penny Arcade Presents The Legend of Zelda: Skyward Sword
A short comic published weekly in five parts on Nintendo's official The Legend of Zelda: Skyward Sword website, written and illustrated by Jerry Holkins and Mike Krahulik under their Penny Arcade Presents series. The story is narrated by Gaepora, Zelda's father.

References

External links

 Ataru Cagiva's commentary on Link's Awakening 
 Ataru Cagiva's commentary on A Link to the Past 
 Akira Himekawa's official list of Zelda manga 

Works based on The Legend of Zelda
Valiant Comics titles
Manga based on video games
Shogakukan franchises
Nintendo franchises
Viz Media manga

ja:ゼルダの伝説シリーズの作品・関連作品の一覧#漫画